Adamantine is a veneer developed by The Celluloid Manufacturing Company of New York City, covered by U.S. Patent number 232,037, dated September 7, 1880. Seth Thomas Clock Company purchased the right to use the adamantine veneer in 1880.  This veneer is sometimes referred to as celluloid and is found on clocks in a wide variety of colors that simulate marble or alabaster.

Seth Thomas clocks used Adamantine to create a Marbaline veneer for their clocks.

References

Thermoplastics